Accidental Tourist may refer to:

 The Accidental Tourist, 1985 novel by Anne Tyler
 The Accidental Tourist (film), 1988 film by Lawrence Kasdan
 Tourist guy, an internet meme of altered photos showing a tourist in unusual locations